Kadu or Kado is a Sino-Tibetan language of the Sal branch spoken in Sagaing Region, Myanmar. Dialects are Settaw, Mawkhwin, and Mawteik [extinct], with 30,000 speakers total.

Names
Alternate names for Kadu listed in Ethnologue are Gadu, Ka’do, Kadu-Ganaan, Kantu’, Kato, Kudo, Maw, Mawteik, Puteik, and Thet; the autonym is Asak.

Geographical distribution
Statistics for Kadu-speaking villages are as follows:
 Over 30 villages speaking the Mawteik dialect (nearly extinct)
 Over 30 villages speaking the Settaw dialect
 5 villages speaking the Mawkhwin dialect

The speakers of the Kadu language live in Banmauk, Indaw, and Pinlebu, which are three townships in the Katha District, Sagaing Region, Myanmar. Among these three, Banmauk has the largest Kadu population and Pinlebu has the smallest Kadu population.

There is low mutual intelligibility among the Kadu dialects.

History 
The Kadu were the dominant ethnic group in the Chindwin River valley at the beginning of the early 2nd millennium A.D. until the Chin people and subsequently the Shan people migrated into the Chindwin Valley (Matisoff 2013:13).

Phonology

Vowels 
Kadu vowels consist of eight monophthongs and a diphthong /ai/.

Consonants 
Kadu has 20 consonants.

The final consonants need to be nasals /m, n, ŋ/ or voiceless stops /p, t, k, ʔ/.

Tone 
Kadu has three tones; high, mid, and low.

Syllabic structure 
C1C2V1V2C3

C: Consonant

V: Vowel

C1: necessary, this can be any Kadu consonant except unvoiced nasals.

C2: optional, this can be only /l, w, y/.

V1: necessary, this can be any Kadu vowel, however, /ɘ/ appears only in the form of CɘC.

V2: optional.

C3: optional, this can be only /p, t, m, n, ʔ, ŋ/.

Grammar 
Kadu is an SOV language.

Nouns 
Abstract nouns such as freedom, love, experience, and anger  are not attested in the Kadu noun class. They are usually expressed by verbs or adjectival verbs.

The language has two categories of nouns:

1, So called "simple nouns" are treated as monomorphemic by the native speakers.

2, Nouns known as "complex nouns" are polymorphemic, and most of the complex nouns come from the process of compounding.

Verbs 
Adjectives that expresses dimensions and qualities such as "tong" (=big) and "lom" (=warm) function as verbs, and are categorized as verbs.

The verbs are structurally categorized as:

1, Simple verbs, which are treated as monomorphemic words by the native speakers.

and

2, Polymorphemic complex verbs.

Kadu verbs may be reduplicated using the same morpheme or may take attendant words to express the repeated or frequent actions.

V-V constructions function as resultative, directional, evaluative, explanatory, or manner.

Adverbs 
The adverbs are also "simple" or "complex" like nouns and verbs.

One thing to point up is that the complex adverbs are derived from verbs or nominals by the processes of reduplication or semi-reduplication.

Numerals 
Most of the native numerals in Kadu are lost.

Numerals are always attached to classifiers, although classifiers do not occur with multiples of ten.

As for ordinal numbers, Burmese ordinal numbers are used because the original ordinal numbers are already lost.

Pronouns

Quantifiers 
Quantifiers follow the head noun they quantify.

Particles 
There are nominal relational markers, verbal particles, clausal particles, utterance final particles, and speaker attitude particles.

Interrogatives

Yes/no interrogatives 
Yes/no questions are formed by simply adding either of the two interrogative particles "la" and "ka" at the end of the phrase.

Alternative questions 
Yes/no questions can also be expressed by an alternative interrogative expression like "is it A or not A", which can be found in Mandarin Chinese as well.

Tag questions 
Interrogative sentences can be made by adding "chi" (=true) at the end of sentences, like "right?" in English language.

Wh- questions 
Wh- questions are formed by attaching the Wh-word forming morphemes, "ma" or "ha", to specific nomials or nominal postpositions.

Wh- question words also may function as indefinite pronouns such as "whatever", "anyone" and so on.

Negation 
Verbs can be negated by negative proclitics, "a-" and "in-".

Words

References

Further reading
Benedict, P. K. (1939). Semantic differentiation in Indo-Chinese. Harvard Journal of Asiatic Studies, 4(3/4), 213–229. Retrieved February 12, 2016 
Brown, R. G. (1920). Kadus of Burma. Bulletin of the School of Oriental Studies, 1(3), 1-28. Retrieved February 12, 2016 
Driem, G. V. (1993). The proto-Tibeto-Burman verbal agreement system. Bulletin of the School of Oriental and African Studies, 56(2), 292–334. Retrieved February 12, 2016  
Grierson, G. (1921). Kadu and its relatives. Bulletin of the School of Oriental Studies, 2(1), 39–41. Retrieved February 12, 2016 
Shafer, R. (1940). The vocalism of Sino-Tibetan. Journal of the American Oriental Society, 60(3), 302–337. Retrieved February 12, 2016, 
Thurgood, G., & LaPolla, R. J. (2003). The Sino-Tibetan languages.
Voegelin, C. F., & Voegelin, F. M. (1965). Languages of the world: Sino-Tibetan fascicle five. Anthropological Linguistics, 7(6), 1-58. Retrieved February 12, 2016

External links
Sample of Spoken Kadu

Sal languages
Languages of Myanmar